Phak Hai is a district (amphoe) in the northwestern part of Ayutthaya province, central Thailand.

History
Historically, the district was named Khwaeng Sena Yai, which became converted  to an amphoe at the end of the 19th century. In 1917, the name of district was changed to be Phak Hai after the central tambon.

The name Phak Hai comes from the Nirat Suphan by Sunthorn Phu, which refers to a village named Ban Pak Hai. The spelling has changed however now, so it can also mean a kind of plant (Momordica charantia) that grows in swamps.

Geography
Neighboring districts are (from the north clockwise) Wiset Chai Chan and Pa Mok of Ang Thong province; Bang Ban, Sena, and Bang Sai of Ayutthaya Province; and Bang Pla Ma, and Mueang Suphanburi of Suphanburi province.

Administration
The district is divided into 16 sub-districts (tambon), which are further subdivided into 128 villages (muban).

In media
Phak Hai is the setting of a Thai country song, (luk thung), titled  'Phak Hai Girl'). It has been popular since around 1970s.

References

External links
 

Phak Hai